The Lynskey tribunal was a British government inquiry, set up in October 1948 to investigate rumours of possible corruption in the Board of Trade.  Under the chairmanship of a High Court judge, Sir George Lynskey, it sat in November and December 1948, hearing testimony from some sixty witnesses who included a number of government ministers and other high-ranking public servants. Much of the inquiry was centered on the relationship between the junior trade minister, John Belcher, and a self-styled business agent, Sidney Stanley, who claimed to have considerable influence in government circles which he was prepared to exercise on behalf of the business community. In its findings, published in January 1949, the tribunal found that Belcher, who admitted that he had accepted hospitality and small gifts from Stanley and from the distiller Sir Maurice Bloch, had been improperly influenced in his ministerial decision-making, although it dismissed allegations that he had received large sums of cash. A director of the Bank of England, George Gibson, was likewise found to have used his position to obtain personal advantage. All other ministers and officials were exonerated. Belcher resigned from his ministerial post and from parliament; Gibson was required to resign from his Bank directorship and from other public offices. Although the possibility of criminal proceedings was briefly considered, no further action was taken against any of the participants in the inquiry.

Background

The years following the Second World War saw the United Kingdom suffering from widespread material shortages and from rationing more severe than it had been during the war. During 1948, allegations began to surface that ministers and civil servants were taking bribes to help businessmen circumvent the rules. Home Secretary James Chuter Ede established a tribunal under High Court judge Sir George Lynskey, assisted by Godfrey Vick KC and Gerald Upjohn KC, and with a broad ranging remit to enquire into the allegations. The enquiry was thought to be sufficiently important to recall Attorney-General Sir Hartley Shawcross from his mission to the United Nations, where he was completing the administration of the Nuremberg Trials, so that he could lead for the government's interest. Arthur Goodhart argued that using Shawcross's elite forensic skills enhanced the efficiency, effectiveness and reputation of the Tribunal.

Allegations
The principal allegations centred on the activities of Sydney Stanley (ne Solomon Wulkan, alias Stanley Rechtand, Koszyski etc.) a fraudster, Zionist Spy, illegal immigrant from Poland and undischarged bankrupt. Stanley mixed with the great and the good of London society and rumours circulated that he was able, through his government contacts, to shortcut "red tape" and arrange preferential treatment, in return for monetary bribes.

It was alleged, inter alia, that Stanley had taken money from:
Harry Sherman, of Sherman Brothers, football pools promoters from Wales, who was seeking:
A greater paper ration;
Discharge of a prosecution for exceeding their current ration; and
Consent of the Capital Issues Committee to become a public company.
An importer of pinball machines who sought further import licences.

Junior minister John Belcher and director of the Bank of England, and former president of the TUC, George Gibson were accused of corruption and they had certainly received gifts from Stanley including suits for which Stanley had provided the clothing coupons. Chancellor of the Duchy of Lancaster Hugh Dalton was also accused, as was Minister of Works Charles Key, and Robert Liversidge, a businessman whose internment during World War II had been something of a cause célèbre. The informal nature of the proceedings, convened without any defined indictment, led to a frenzy of speculation and allegation in the press.

Though Stanley had been named as a Zionist spy by an MI5 report, which accused him of passing on information gained from Manny Shinwell a Jewish cabinet minister and known supporter of Zionism, to the extreme Zionist terrorist group Irgun which at the time was carrying out a campaign of bombings and assassinations, against British officials and Palestinian civilians, in an attempt to overthrow the British Mandatory Government of Palestine. 
Shinwell was certainly acquainted with Stanley, having requested his help and perceived influence in finding Shinwell's son Ernie suitable employment in the private sector.
The Irgun thus obtained in advance such information as the disbandment of the Transjordan Frontier Force.

The Tribunal focused solely on Stanley's fraudulent financial activities and influence-peddling, neglecting all allegations about his spying which were not raised at the tribunal.

Tribunal
The Tribunal sat in public for 26 days hearing witnesses at Church House, Westminster, with Stanley in attendance. It was a great public spectacle. The tribunal rose just before Christmas 1948 and reported on 28 January 1949.

Findings and aftermath
The enquiry concluded that Belcher and Gibson had been influenced in their public conduct and the police were of the view that they could be charged though Shawcross argued that prosecution would not be in the public interest so long as they resigned. Belcher and Gibson resigned. The Civil Service, Dalton, Key, Liversidge and others were exonerated. Stanley was proved a liar. Though no steps were taken to prosecute Stanley, there was a widespread sentiment that he ought to be deported. He left the UK, somewhat clandestinely, for Israel in April 1949.

The Tribunal led to the establishment of a Committee on Intermediaries to examine "how far persons are making a business of acting as ... intermediaries between Government Departments and the public, and to report whether the activities of such persons are liable to give rise to abuses..."

Geoffrey Fisher, the Archbishop of Canterbury, seemed to capture much public distaste for the revelations of the tribunal when he observed:

References

Bibliography
[Anon.] (1949a) Report of the tribunal appointed to inquire into allegations reflecting on the official conduct of ministers of the crown and other public servants, Cmd. 7617
— (1949b) Proceedings of the tribunal appointed to inquire into allegations reflecting on the official conduct of ministers of the crown and other public servants

— (2004) "Belcher, John William (1905–1964)", Oxford Dictionary of National Biography, Oxford University Press, accessed 20 July 2007 (subscription required)

Bryson, G. (2004) "Lynskey, Sir George Justin (1888–1957)", Oxford Dictionary of National Biography, Oxford University Press accessed 21 July 2007 (subscription required)
Day, P. (2000) "Attlee’s Government was Riddled with Sleaze", The Independent, 5 January, p.8

Gross, J. (1963) "The Lynskey Tribunal", in 

Newell, J. L. (2007) "Ethical Conduct and Perceptions of Public Probity in Britain: the Story so Far", paper presented to the workshop on "Corruption and Democracy in Europe: Public Opinion and Social Representations", University of Salford, 29–31 March.

— (2005) "Gibson, George (1885–1953)", Oxford Dictionary of National Biography, Oxford University Press, accessed 21 July 2007 (subscription required)

1948 in law
Political scandals in the United Kingdom
Public inquiries in the United Kingdom
January 1949 events in the United Kingdom